Cephalotaxus sinensis is a coniferous shrub or small tree in the family Taxaceae. It is native to central and southern China.

Some botanists consider Cephalotaxus koreana and C. sinensis to be synonymous with Cephalotaxus harringtonii.

References

Flora of China
sinensis
Least concern plants